Acacia acinacea, commonly known as gold dust wattle, is a flowering shrub. It is native to south eastern Australia and lives for 15 years on average. This wattle species is tolerant of drought and frost. It is also known as wreath wattle or round-leaf wattle.

Description
It has glabrous or hairy branchlets that are angled at the extremities. Like most species of Acacia it has phyllodes rather than true leaves. It blooms, usually prolifically, between July and November producing spherical flower-heads with a diameter of  containing 8 to 20 golden coloured flowers. After flowering glabrous, crustaceous seed pods form that are circinnate to spirally coiled or irregularly twisted.

Taxonomy
The species was first formally described by the botanist John Lindley in 1838 as part of Thomas Mitchell's work Three Expeditions into the interior of Eastern Australia. It has many synonyms including Acacia acinacea var. acinacea and Racosperma acinaceum.
The specific epithet, acinacea, derives from the Latin for a short Persian sword (acinaces) and references the shape of the phyllodes.

Distribution
It is endemic and common throughout most of Victoria, south eastern South Australia, south eastern New South Wales and the Australian Capital Territory. It is often found in hilly country and grows well in sand, sandy loam and gravelly soils as a part of Eucalyptus woodlands, woodland heath and open mallee scrubland communities. It is a hardy, free-flowering species with very specific soil requirements. The requirements are that the soil is well-drained and non-saline, although it can tolerate many different types.

References

External links

 Australian National Government
 Florabank fact sheet

acinacea
Fabales of Australia
Flora of Victoria (Australia)
Flora of South Australia
Taxa named by John Lindley
Plants described in 1838